Kensington–Cedar Cottage is one of the most ethnically diverse neighbourhoods in east Vancouver, British Columbia, Canada.

Location 

History 
The area was first settled in 1888 when Arthur Wilson bought a plot of land and began the Cedar Cottage Nursery.

Trout Lake 
John Hendry Park, named after the lumber industrialist John Hendry who owned the land, is located in the north-east of Kensington–Cedar Cottage. In the centre of the park is Trout Lake, once the water source for the Hastings Sawmill. The park also houses an ice rink, that was built for the 2010 Winter Olympics, and Trout Lake Community Centre.

Like most of East Vancouver, Kensington–Cedar Cottage used to be predominantly working class but rising house prices have made the area increasingly popular with young professionals and families who can no longer afford houses in areas such as the west side.

Demographics
Kensington–Cedar Cottage is younger and more diverse than the rest of the city. Only a third of residents (34.7%) in Kensington–Cedar Cottage speak English as a mother tongue, compared to roughly half of residents in Vancouver as a whole. Chinese languages (Mandarin or Cantonese) are the second most common mother tongues, spoken by 34.1% of residents. The median 2016 family income in Kensington–Cedar Cottage was $77,240, which is lower than the 2016 Vancouver average of $83,845.

Notes

References 

Neighbourhoods in Vancouver